Patrick Meier (born 15 March 1976 in Winterthur) is a Swiss former competitive figure skater. He is the 1995 Karl Schäfer Memorial silver medalist and a seven-time Swiss national champion.

Meier began skating at the age of six. He represented Switzerland at the European Figure Skating Championships, the World Figure Skating Championships, and the 1998 Winter Olympics, where he placed 22nd. Meier became the first Swiss skater to perform a triple Axel in competition, at the 1995 Karl Schäfer Memorial. He studied law at the University of Zürich.

Programs

Results

References

External links 
 

Swiss male single skaters
Figure skaters at the 1998 Winter Olympics
Olympic figure skaters of Switzerland
1976 births
Living people
People from Winterthur
Competitors at the 2001 Winter Universiade
Sportspeople from the canton of Zürich